For lists of German prisoner-of-war camps, see:
 German prisoner-of-war camps in World War I
 German prisoner-of-war camps in World War II